The 2009–10 season was Real Madrid Club de Fútbol's 79th season in La Liga. This article shows player statistics and all matches (official and friendly) that the club played during the 2009–10 season.

The newly constructed Second Galácticos of President Pérez looked to reverse the misfortunes of past years. The 2009–10 season, however, was a transitional one as Madrid again finished second in the league, although this time amassing 96 points, the club's record at the time, and went out of the Champions League at the hands of Lyon. The season was marred by Cristiano Ronaldo's injury, that sidelined him for seven weeks, although he still topped the goalscoring charts with 33 goals, and Madrid became the highest scoring team in La Liga, with 102 goals. Real Madrid also had the misfortune to become the runners-up with the highest points total in the history of Europe's top five leagues, until surpassed by Liverpool's 97 points in the 2018–19 Premier League.

Club

Coaching staff

Kit

|
| 
|

Other information

Players

Squad information

Players in / out

In

Total spending:  €261 million

Out

Squad stats

Goals

Disciplinary record

.

Overall
{|class="wikitable" style="text-align: center;"
|-
!
!Total
! Home 
! Away
|-
|align=left| Games played || 48 || 24 || 24
|-
|align=left| Games won    || 36 || 21 || 15
|-
|align=left| Games drawn  ||  5 || 1 || 4
|-
|align=left| Games lost   ||  7 || 2 || 5
|-
|align=left| Biggest win  || 6–0 vs Zaragoza || 6–0 vs Zaragoza || 5–1 vs Tenerife
|-
|align=left| Biggest loss || 0–4 vs Alcorcón || 0–2 vs Barcelona || 0–4 vs Alcorcón
|-
|align=left| Biggest win (League) || 6–0 vs Zaragoza || 6–0 vs Zaragoza || 5–1 vs Tenerife
|-
|align=left| Biggest win (Cup) || 1–0 vs Alcorcón || 1–0 vs Alcorcón || –
|-
|align=left| Biggest win (Europe) || 5–2 vs Zürich || 3–0 vs Marseille || 5–2 vs Zürich
|-
|align=left| Biggest loss (League) || 0–2 vs Barcelona || 0–2 vs Barcelona || 1–2 vs Sevilla
|-
|align=left| Biggest loss (Cup) || 0–4 vs Alcorcón || – || 0–4 vs Alcorcón
|-
|align=left| Biggest loss (Europe) || 2–3 vs Milan || 2–3 vs Milan || 0–1 vs Lyon
|-
|align=left| Clean sheets || 18 || 12 || 6
|-
|align=left| Goals scored || 119 || 68 || 51
|-
|align=left| Goals conceded  || 48 || 22 || 26
|-
|align=left| Goal difference || +71 || +46 || +25
|-
|-
|-
|align=left| Yellow cards     || 118 || 46 || 72
|-
|align=left| Red cards        || 3 || 2 || 1
|-
|align=left| Most appearances ||  Iker Casillas (46) || colspan=2|–
|-
|align=left| Most minutes played ||  Iker Casillas (4326) || colspan=2|–
|-
|align=left| Top scorer       ||  Cristiano Ronaldo (33) || colspan=2|–
|-
|align=left| Top assistor     ||  Guti (10) || colspan=2|–
|-
|align=left| Points           || 113/144 (%) || 64/72 (%) || 49/72 (%)
|-
|align=left| Winning rate     || % || % || %
|-

Competitions

La Liga

League table

Results by round

Matches

Copa del Rey

Round of 32

UEFA Champions League

Group stage

Knockout phase

Round of 16

Pre-season and friendlies

See also
2009–10 UEFA Champions League
2009–10 La Liga
2009–10 Copa del Rey

References

Real Madrid
Real Madrid CF seasons